Beaver Dam is an antebellum plantation house located on the northern edge of present-day Knightdale, Wake County, North Carolina.  The house was built around 1810 by Col. William Hinton, brother of Charles Lewis Hinton who built the nearby Midway Plantation.  At its height, the Beaver Dam plantation encompassed around  tended by the forced labor of about 50 enslaved people.

It was listed on the National Register of Historic Places in 1987.

In 2005, the house was purchased by Hinton Land, LLC and underwent a 6-month restoration by Lambeth Restoration, HagerSmith Architects, Williams Realty and Building Company, John Stein Painting, Western Cedar Supply, and others.

See also
 List of Registered Historic Places in North Carolina
 National Register of Historic Places listings in Wake County, North Carolina

References

Plantation houses in North Carolina
Houses on the National Register of Historic Places in North Carolina
Federal architecture in North Carolina
Houses completed in 1810
Houses in Wake County, North Carolina
National Register of Historic Places in Wake County, North Carolina